Hyalea is a genus of large moths of the family Crambidae. It was described by Achille Guenée in 1854.

Species
Hyalea africalis Hampson, 1912
Hyalea boliviensis Dognin, 1905
Hyalea dividalis Geyer in Hübner, 1832 (Brazil)
Hyalea glaucopidalis Guenée, 1854
Hyalea pallidalis Hampson, 1898 (Brazil/Peru)
Hyalea succinalis Guenée, 1854 (Brazil)

References

Pyraustinae
Crambidae genera
Taxa named by Achille Guenée